The Mount Cameroon brush-furred rat or Rosevear's brush-furred mouse (Lophuromys roseveari) is a species of rodent in the family Muridae. It is found only in Cameroon. Its natural habitats are subtropical or tropical moist montane forests, subtropical or tropical moist shrubland, subtropical or tropical high-altitude shrubland, subtropical or tropical high-altitude grassland, plantations, and rural gardens.

References

Endemic fauna of Cameroon
Lophuromys
Mammals described in 1997
Taxonomy articles created by Polbot